The Vemac RD320R  is a race car produced by the Japanese manufacturer Vemac (:ja: VEMAC) that raced in the Japanese Super GT GT300 class. It raced between 2002 and 2012. It completed over 150 races in Japan alone. 

When it was introduced in 2002, it used a 3.2 liter Honda V6 engine from the NSX. Later Vemac updated the car by improving its aerodynamics and replacing the engine with a 3.5 liter Zytek V8. This updated spec car was called the RD350R. Vemac updated the car again in an attempt at entering the car in the GT500 class. The engine was upgraded to a 4.5 liter Mugen V8 engine. It raced in the GT500 class in 2004 as the, but with no success. In the following seasons the car ran with reduced power in the GT300 class until 2008. After the Super GT rule changes in 2012 that excluded low-volume production cars from entering the races, Vemac's cars were unable to continue racing in the series.

References

Grand tourer racing cars